On 14 October 2015, a suicide bombing killed at least 7 people and injured thirteen others in Taunsa Sharif, Punjab, Pakistan. The attack took place inside the political office of Pakistan Muslim League (N) MNA Sardar Amjad Farooq Khan Khosa, who was not present. Sardar Khosa, who was attending a meeting in Islamabad, said he did not receive any threat or alert prior to the blast. A Tehrik-i-Taliban Pakistan splinter group, Jamaat-ul-Ahrar, claimed responsibility for the attack.

See also
List of terrorist incidents, 2015
Terrorist incidents in Pakistan in 2015

References

2015 murders in Pakistan
21st-century mass murder in Pakistan
Terrorist incidents in Pakistan in 2015
Mass murder in 2015
October 2015 events in Pakistan